Carex melinacra is a tussock-forming species of perennial sedge in the family Cyperaceae. It is native to south central parts of China in Yunnan and Sichuan.

See also
List of Carex species

References

melinacra
Taxa named by Adrien René Franchet
Plants described in 1897
Flora of Sichuan
Flora of Yunnan